Oromerycidae is a small (both in size and diversity), extinct  family of artiodactyls (even-toed hoofed mammals) closely related to living camels, known from the early to late Eocene of western North America.

Oromerycids are placed in the artiodactyl suborder Tylopoda, which also includes camels and a variable number of extinct families. Some researchers have viewed the similarity to camels as strong enough to warrant placement of oromerycids within the family Camelidae as a subfamily, Oromerycinae, but most have favored placement in a distinct family, albeit a closely related one.

Oromerycids were very similar to early members of other tylopod families, but they lack the specializations of those families, such as the bony protuberances on the skulls of protoceratids or the strongly elongated limbs of camels. Like other tylopods, oromerycids had selenodont teeth and gracile limbs. In fact, oromerycids show only a few specializations that distinguish them from other tylopods, the most notable being fusion of the radius and ulna in the forearm and the presence of a cleft between the entoconid and hypoconulid cusps on the last lower molar.

References

 Prothero, D.R., 1998. Oromerycidae. pp. 426–430 in C.M. Janis, K.M. Scott, and L.L. Jacobs (eds.) Evolution of Tertiary Mammals of North America. Volume 1: Terrestrial Carnivores, Ungulates, and Ungulatelike Mammals. Cambridge University Press, Cambridge. 

Prehistoric tylopods
Eocene even-toed ungulates
Prehistoric mammals of North America
Eocene first appearances
Eocene extinctions
Prehistoric mammal families